Stewart Wilken (born 11 November 1966), known as The Boetie Boer, is a convicted serial killer from South Africa. Wilken is regarded as a highly unusual serial killer, having killed individuals from two distinct victim types: female prostitutes and young boys (he also killed his adolescent daughter, Wuane). Wilken killed from 1990 until he was arrested in January 1997. He was active in Port Elizabeth, on the east coast of South Africa.

Wilken was charged with 10 counts of murder and 5 counts of sodomy on 3 February 1997. He was convicted of 7 counts of murder and 2 counts of sodomy on 20 February 1998. Wilken received seven life sentences and was further advised by Justice Chris Jansen that he would have received the death penalty had it still been available to him.

He killed his daughter, Wuane, who was born from his first marriage. He said that she was sexually abused by her step-dad so he wanted to send her soul to God. He also killed Henry Bakers, the son of his second wife. He said during an interview with the police that he had sex with Henry's decomposing corpse. He also stated that he ate the nipples of one of his victims.

See also
List of serial killers by country
List of serial killers by number of victims

References 

1966 births
Crimes against sex workers
Filicides
Living people
Male serial killers
Necrophiles
People convicted of murder by South Africa
People from Boksburg
South African cannibals
South African murderers of children
South African people convicted of murder
South African serial killers
Violence against men in Africa
Violence against women in South Africa